Manor Park, a northern suburb of Lower Hutt City, lies in the south of the North Island of New Zealand. The suburb separates the western bank of the Hutt River from  State Highway 2.

History
At the end of 1925, W.H. George auctioned his Manor Park Estate, which at the time was part of Haywards. Much of it was subdivided and sold as township sections. Part of the land was purchased by Karori Golf Club, which renamed itself to Manor Park Golf Club after moving there and opening a course in 1926.

A flood in April 1931 swept away Manor Park Bridge, a private bridge that connected the suburb with Stokes Valley. The flood also caused damage to the Manor Park Golf Course.

The suburb was previously home to Manor Park School, which has admission records dating back to 1962. The school was declared closed on 15 February 1996.

Landmarks
Manor Park is home to the Manor Park Golf Club. The suburb is mostly residential, other than the aforementioned golf club and a small private hospital. Over recent years new houses have been built at the southern end of the suburb.

Demographics

Manor Park had a population of 417 at the 2018 New Zealand census, an increase of 27 people (6.9%) since the 2013 census, and an increase of 36 people (9.4%) since the 2006 census. There were 135 households. There were 219 males and 198 females, giving a sex ratio of 1.11 males per female. The median age was 45.8 years (compared with 37.4 years nationally), with 57 people (13.7%) aged under 15 years, 75 (18.0%) aged 15 to 29, 180 (43.2%) aged 30 to 64, and 102 (24.5%) aged 65 or older.

Ethnicities were 82.7% European/Pākehā, 12.2% Māori, 5.0% Pacific peoples, 12.9% Asian, and 1.4% other ethnicities (totals add to more than 100% since people could identify with multiple ethnicities).

The proportion of people born overseas was 23.0%, compared with 27.1% nationally.

Although some people objected to giving their religion, 50.4% had no religion, 32.4% were Christian, 2.9% were Hindu, 2.2% were Buddhist and 5.0% had other religions.

Of those at least 15 years old, 60 (16.7%) people had a bachelor or higher degree, and 66 (18.3%) people had no formal qualifications. The median income was $31,400, compared with $31,800 nationally. The employment status of those at least 15 was that 162 (45.0%) people were employed full-time, 36 (10.0%) were part-time, and 9 (2.5%) were unemployed.

References

External links
Manor Park Golf Club website

Suburbs of Lower Hutt
Populated places on Te Awa Kairangi / Hutt River